Dysschema on is a moth of the family Erebidae. It was described by Hering in 1928. It is found in Brazil.

References

Dysschema
Moths described in 1928